Thatipatri Gnanamma (1822 – 1874) was a Roman Catholic lay woman who founded the congregation of Sisters of St. Anne of Madras and Sisters of St. Anne Phirangipuram. She was declared Servant of God by the Holy See on 21 January 2014.

Early life 
Gnanamma was born in 1822 in Phirangipuram, Guntur, Andhra Pradesh, India to a Telugu Kamma family. She was the second child of Mr. Gali Rayana and Mrs. Mariamma. She was married to Innaiah in 1837. She had two sons, who both joined a seminary to study for the priesthood. She was widowed at the age of 37.

Founding of Orders 
Gnanamma started a school for girls in Phirangipuram in 1862. Two young women, Arulamma and Agathamma, joined her in her social work in 1871. Gnanamma talked with the parish priest about forming a congregation of nuns and sent young women to train under the Sisters of the Congregation of the Good Shepherd, Bellary. She started two congregations, one at Madras and another at Phirangipuram. Her congregations came into existence after her death.

Death 
Gnanamma died in Phirangipuram on 21 December 1874 after suffering from chronic asthma. She was buried in the parish cemetery.

Beatification 
She was declared a Servant of God by the Holy See on 21 January 2014.

References

See also 
List of saints of India

1822 births
1874 deaths
Founders
Indian Servants of God
Indian Roman Catholics
Indian missionaries